Pancratium caribaeum is a scientific name for a plant which has been used as a synonym for:

Hymenocallis caribaea, Caribbean spider-lily
Hymenocallis speciosa, green-tinge spiderlily